WIGO-FM is a Country formatted broadcast radio station licensed to White Stone, Virginia, serving the Northern Neck and the Middle Peninsula of Virginia.  WIGO-FM is owned and operated by Two Rivers Communications, Inc.

References

External links
 104.9 WIGO Country Online
 

1995 establishments in Virginia
Country radio stations in the United States
Radio stations established in 1995
IGO-FM